John Marcus O'Sullivan (18 February 1881 – 9 February 1948) was an Irish Fine Gael politician who served as Minister for Education from 1926 to 1932 and Parliamentary Secretary to the Minister for Finance from 1924 to 1926. He served as a Teachta Dála (TD) from 1923 to 1943.

O'Sullivan was born in Killarney, County Kerry, in 1881, the second son of M. O'Sullivan, a merchant. He was educated at St Brendan's College, Killarney, Clongowes Wood College, and later at University College Dublin (UCD), University of Bonn and Heidelberg University, where he was awarded a PhD. He was appointed to the Chair of Modern History at UCD in 1910.

He was first elected to Dáil Éireann in 1923 as a Cumann na nGaedheal TD for the Kerry North constituency. He served as Parliamentary Secretary to the Minister for Finance from 1924 to 1926. He was appointed to the Cabinet in 1926, serving under W. T. Cosgrave as Minister for Education. In 1926, a report from the Second National Programme Conference was presented to him as the Minister for Education. He accepted all proposals stated in the report to be recommended as a national curriculum. His major ministerial achievement was the Vocational Education Act 1930. He served on the Irish delegation to the League of Nations, in 1924 and from 1928 to 1930. He was re-elected at every election until 1943 when he lost his Dáil seat. He subsequently retired from politics.

He was married to Agnes Crotty, and they had 4 children, two sons and two daughters. O'Sullivan died on 9 February 1948, at his home in Rathgar, Dublin.

References

External links
 

 

1881 births
1948 deaths
Cumann na nGaedheal TDs
Fine Gael TDs
Members of the 4th Dáil
Members of the 5th Dáil
Members of the 6th Dáil
Members of the 7th Dáil
Members of the 8th Dáil
Members of the 9th Dáil
Members of the 10th Dáil
Politicians from County Kerry
Alumni of University College Dublin
People educated at Clongowes Wood College
People educated at St Brendan's College, Killarney
Ministers for Education (Ireland)
Parliamentary Secretaries of the 4th Dáil